The appeal to the State Duma of Russia to charge Vladimir Putin with treason is an initiative of council deputies of the Smolnynske municipal entity in Saint Petersburg and the Lomonosov municipal district of Moscow, on September 8, 2022, which called for the head of the Kremlin, Vladimir Putin, to be charged with treason. The next day, seven deputies were called to the police.

Reasons
The reason for the appearance of this appeal, according to seven deputies of the council of the municipal district No. 80 of Smolnynske in the Central District of St. Petersburg, was the order of the President of the Russian Federation Vladimir Putin on a full-scale invasion of the territory of Ukraine on February 24, 2022. According to MP Dmytro Palyuga, the exact opposite of one of the goals declared by the Russian president — the demilitarization of Ukraine — is happening. Thus, within the framework of his rhetoric, V. Putin is harming the security of the Russian Federation. "We want to show people that there are deputies who do not agree with the current course and believe that Putin is harming Russia. We want to show people that we are not afraid to talk about it," clarified the municipal deputy. Therefore, according to the initiators, Putin's actions since the beginning of the so-called "special military operation" fall under Article 93 of the Constitution of Russia, according to which the president can be dismissed from office on the basis of charges of treason or other serious crimes brought by the State Duma.

Main provisions
In the text of the appeal, published on September 7, 2022, by the municipal deputy Dmytro Palyuga, it is noted that during the war, "combat units" of the Russian Armed Forces are destroyed, because the Russian army loses its combat units, and citizens become disabled. Accordingly, "young able-bodied" citizens die. Vladimir Putin's decision to attack Ukraine "harms the security of Russia and its citizens." In addition, the withdrawal of foreign companies from the Russian market and the emigration of the educated population cannot "pass without a trace for the economic well-being of Russian citizens." The entire Russian economy is suffering.

In addition, as a result of the aggression, the length of the border with NATO countries has more than doubled due to Russian aggression. Contrary to the declared goals of the "SMO" (Special Military Operation), NATO is expanding to the east, and Ukraine is receiving more and more modern weapons, although one of the declared goals of the so-called "special operation" was its "demilitarization".

"In this regard, we ask you as deputies of the State Duma to come up with a proposal to bring charges of treason against the President of the Russian Federation in order to dismiss him from office," the document says.

Later, in a conversation with The Insider, Deputy Dmytro Palyuga specified that 7 out of 10 members of the St. Petersburg Municipal Council voted for sending the document.

The next day, September 8, 2022, the Council of Deputies of the Lomonosov Municipal District in Moscow turned to Vladimir Putin with a request to draw up the powers of the President of the Russian Federation. The appeal says: "Studies show that in countries with regular changes of power, people live better and longer on average than in those where the leader leaves office only with his feet forward... In connection with the above, we ask you to resign from office due to the fact that your views, your management model are hopelessly outdated, and hinder the development of Russia and its human potential".

Effects
On Friday, September 9, 2022, seven deputies of the council of the Smolnynske Municipal Entity in St. Petersburg, who called to accuse the head of the Kremlin Vladimir Putin of treason, were summoned to the police. In the notification of the Ministry of Internal Affairs for the Central District of St. Petersburg, the deputies are accused of actions aimed at "discrediting the current government." Currently, seven citizens of the Russian Federation, who made a proposal to appeal to the State Duma of the Russian Federation to accuse Vladimir Putin of treason, have been issued protocols in the city police department No. 76 (Part 1 of Article 20.3.3 of the Code of Administrative Offenses of the Russian Federation). Five deputies received fines in the amount of 44,000-47,000 rubles. Then, on September 13, the Smolninsky District Court of St. Petersburg recognized that the municipal council did not hold meetings, and on this basis, it could be dissolved.

See also
2014 anti-war protests in Russia
2022 anti-war protests in Russia

References

2022 in Russia
Events affected by the 2022 Russian invasion of Ukraine
Reactions to the Russo-Ukrainian War
Vladimir Putin